Hyptiotes is a genus of spiders in the family Uloboridae.

Feeding
Hyptiotes creates a triangular web and sits at a vertex until it detects vibrations that signify the collision of its prey. At this moment the spider releases a coil of silk which it has held taut in such a manner that the tension of the web causes it to entangle the prey. The spider then wraps its prey in special wrapping silk.

Species
 Hyptiotes affinis Bösenberg & Strand, 1906 — China, Korea, Taiwan, Japan
 Hyptiotes akermani Wiehle, 1964 — South Africa
 Hyptiotes analis Simon, 1892 — Sri Lanka
 Hyptiotes cavatus (Hentz, 1847) — USA, Canada
 Hyptiotes dentatus Wunderlich, 2008 — France
 Hyptiotes fabaceus Dong, Zhu & Yoshida, 2005 — China
 Hyptiotes flavidus (Blackwall, 1862) — Mediterranean to Russia
 Hyptiotes gerhardti Wiehle, 1929 — Greece, southern Russia
 Hyptiotes gertschi Chamberlin & Ivie, 1935 — USA, Canada, Alaska
 Hyptiotes himalayensis Tikader, 1981 — India
 Hyptiotes indicus Simon, 1905 — India
 Hyptiotes paradoxus (C. L. Koch, 1834) — Palearctic
 Hyptiotes puebla Muma & Gertsch, 1964 — USA
 Hyptiotes solanus Dong, Zhu & Yoshida, 2005 — China
 Hyptiotes tehama Muma & Gertsch, 1964 — USA
 Hyptiotes xinlongensis Liu, Wang & Peng, 1991 — China

References

Uloboridae
Spiders of Asia
Spiders of Africa
Spiders of North America
Spiders of Europe
Araneomorphae genera